Clark Thomas Carlton is a novelist, playwright, and a screen and television writer living in Los Angeles. He has also worked as a producer of reality television. Carlton is best known for his science fiction/fantasy novel Prophets of the Ghost Ants published by HarperCollins Voyager in 2016.

Author

Carlton is the author of Prophets of the Ghost Ants, Book 1 of the Antasy Series published by HarperCollins Voyage on December 13, 2016. The indie version of the book was named a Best of 2011 by Kirkus Reviews. The sequel, Book 2 of the Antasy Series is The Prophet of the Termite God which will be released on April 13, 2019.

Playwright

In 1997, Carlton was awarded the Drama-Logue Critics Award for his play Self Help or the Tower of Psychobabble along with playwrights Neil Simon and Henry Ong. The play, a satire of the psychotherapy industry, was performed in Santa Monica, Palm Springs, Los Angeles and West Hollywood and directed by Michael Kearns and was also produced in Chicago.

Painter

Carlton is a painter who embraces the description of his work as "Grandma Moses on acid".  His work has been displayed through the Palm Springs Art Museum Annex through the Palm Springs Arts Council.

Musician, singer-songwriter

In December 1999, Carlton released an album of songs titled Salt Water through CD baby where he accompanied himself on acoustic guitar. At present he is at work on Gardens of Babylon, a synth pop opera about the building of the Hanging Gardens of Babylon. The opera was written with his partner, Mike Dobson, an Emmy award winning music supervisor and composer on the daytime drama, the Young and the Restless.

References

External links 
 
 Clark T. Carlton's Twitter
 Prophets of the Ghost Ant's Facebook page

21st-century American novelists
21st-century American male writers
American male novelists
American science fiction writers
Living people
Year of birth missing (living people)